Thakur Prasad Gyawaly is 27th Chief of Nepal Police. He was appointed as the Chief of Nepal Police after succeeding Sarbendra Khanal on February 12, 2020 by the cabinet decision of the Government of Nepal.

References

Nepalese police officers
Inspectors General of Police (Nepal)
Living people
1965 births